Gladbachus is an extinct genus of chondrichthyan.

References

Devonian fish of Europe
Middle Devonian animals